"Matador" is a song by Arctic Monkeys. It was released as a bonus track on the Japanese version of their second album, Favourite Worst Nightmare (2007) and as a limited edition 7" single in the UK backed with "Da Frame 2R" (pronounced "Da Frame Tour", also known as "The Frame to Relevance"), the other Japanese bonus track. It was also released as a download-only single, this time with "Da Frame 2R" as the lead (opening) track. The vinyl was limited to a release of only 1000 copies.

The reason given by Domino Records for this limited release is to prevent western fans from having to buy the more expensive Japanese version of Favourite Worst Nightmare in order to attain these extra tracks.

Track listing

References

2007 singles
Arctic Monkeys songs
Songs written by Alex Turner (musician)
Song recordings produced by James Ford (musician)
2006 songs
Domino Recording Company singles